Mihăileni may refer to several places in Romania:

 Mihăileni, Botoșani, a commune in Botoşani County
 Mihăileni, Harghita, a commune in Harghita County
 Mihăileni, Sibiu, a commune in Sibiu County
 Mihăileni, a village in Șimonești Commune, Harghita County
 Mihăileni, a village in Buceș Commune, Hunedoara County

and several places in Moldova:

 Mihăileni, Rîşcani, a commune in Rîşcani district
 Mihăileni, Briceni, a commune in Briceni district
 Mihăilenii Noi, a village in Vasileuţi Commune, Rîşcani district

See also 
 Mihai (name)
 Mihăești (disambiguation)
 Mihăiești (disambiguation)
 Mihăilești